Tamilla Rashidovna Abassova (born 9 December 1982, in Moscow) is a Russian racing cyclist who won the silver medal in the women's sprint event at the 2004 Summer Olympics in Athens and the silver medal at the 2005 UCI Track Cycling World Championships in the same event.

She is of mixed Azerbaijani-Russian descent, and a practicing Baptist.

References

External links
profile 
dataOlympics profile

1982 births
Living people
Azerbaijani Baptists
Cyclists at the 2004 Summer Olympics
Olympic cyclists of Russia
Olympic silver medalists for Russia
Cyclists from Moscow
Russian female cyclists
Olympic medalists in cycling
Medalists at the 2004 Summer Olympics
Russian Baptists
Russian sportspeople of Azerbaijani descent